Dan E. Caison Sr. House is a historic home located at Roseboro, Sampson County, North Carolina.   The house was built in 1924, and is a two-story, Bungalow / American Craftsman style frame dwelling.  It has a gable roof with exposed projecting rafters and triangular brackets, porte cochere, and a wrap-around porch with an intersecting gable roof.  Also on the property are the contributing garage and small maid's house.

It was added to the National Register of Historic Places in 1986.

References

Houses on the National Register of Historic Places in North Carolina
Houses completed in 1924
Houses in Sampson County, North Carolina
National Register of Historic Places in Sampson County, North Carolina